Econometrica is a peer-reviewed academic journal of economics, publishing articles in many areas of economics, especially econometrics. It is published by Wiley-Blackwell on behalf of the Econometric Society. The current editor-in-chief is Guido Imbens.

History 
Econometrica was established in 1933. Its first editor was Ragnar Frisch, recipient of the first Nobel Memorial Prize in Economic Sciences in 1969, who served as an editor from 1933 to 1954. Although Econometrica is currently published entirely in English, the first few issues also contained scientific articles written in French.

Indexing and abstracting 
Econometrica is abstracted and indexed in:
 Scopus
 EconLit
 Social Science Citation Index

According to the Journal Citation Reports, the journal has a 2020 impact factor of 5.844, ranking it 22/557 in the category "Economics".

Awards issued 
The Econometric Society aims to attract high-quality applied work in economics for publication in Econometrica through the Frisch Medal. This prize is awarded every two years for an empirical or theoretical applied article published in Econometrica during the past five years.

Notable papers
Even apart from those being awarded with the Frisch medal, numerous Econometrica articles have been highly influential in economics and social sciences, including:

References

External links
 

Economics journals
Econometrics journals
Wiley-Blackwell academic journals
Publications established in 1933
English-language journals
Bimonthly journals
1933 in economics
Econometric Society
Academic journals associated with learned and professional societies